Marshall County High School may refer to:
 Marshall County High School (Kentucky)
 2018 Marshall County High School shooting
 Marshall County High School (Tennessee)